The 2010 United States Senate election in Louisiana was held on November 2, 2010.  Republican incumbent U.S. Senator David Vitter won re-election to a second term, becoming the first Republican ever to be re-elected to the United States Senate from Louisiana.

Background 
 Party primaries: Saturday, August 28, 2010
 Runoffs (if necessary): Saturday, October 2, 2010
 General Election: Tuesday, November 2, 2010

Vitter faced a potentially serious challenge in the Republican primary as well as the general election. Lieutenant General Russel L. Honoré, who is best known for serving as commander of Joint Task Force Katrina responsible for coordinating military relief efforts for Hurricane Katrina-affected areas across the Gulf Coast, was allegedly mulling over whether or not to challenge Vitter in the Republican Primary. Tony Perkins, a former Louisiana state representative and current president of the socially conservative Family Research Council, acknowledged interest in running against Vitter because of the prostitution scandal. Nonetheless, Perkins decided not to run and endorsed Vitter for reelection.

Some speculated that Vitter's reelection might have become complicated, by the prostitution scandal revealed in 2007, but he continued to lead in aggregate polling against potential opponents.

Following a movement to draft him into the race, John Cooksey, a former U.S. Representative, appeared poised to put together a challenge, planning on spending $200,000 of his own money. Cooksey, however, pulled back and did not qualify.

A campaign to draft porn actress Stormy Daniels began in early 2009. She considered whether to run but ultimately declined to qualify.

On June 14, 2009, Congressman Charlie Melançon announced his intentions to run for Senate in 2010. Melançon, who was representing Louisiana's 3rd Congressional District since 2005, released the announcement to his supporters, saying that "Louisiana needs a different approach, more bi-partisan, more disciplined, more honest and with a whole lot more common sense." Melançon was a leader of the Blue Dog Coalition, a group of fiscally conservative Democrats who aim to lower the deficit and reform the budget.

In the weeks before the election a major concern for Vitter's camp was possibly voter apathy about the race. For example, publisher Rolfe H. McCollister Jr., in his Greater Baton Rouge Business Report,  endorsed fellow Republican Jay Dardenne over Democrat Caroline Fayard in the simultaneous race for Lieutenant Governor of Louisiana, but then explicitly made "no endorsement" for U.S. Senate:
I have talked with a number of voters who are just not very excited about this race—the candidates or the tone. I'm not either. You're on your own here.

Democratic primary

Candidates 
 Charlie Melançon, U.S. Representative
 Neeson Chauvin
 Cary Deaton

Polling

Results

Republican primary

Candidates 
 David Vitter, incumbent U.S. Senator
 Nick Accardo, doctor
 Chet D. Traylor, former Louisiana Supreme Court justice

Polling

Results

Libertarian primary

Candidates 
 Anthony Gentile
 Randall Todd Hayes

Results

General election

Candidates

Major 
 Charlie Melançon (D), U.S. Congressman
 David Vitter (R), incumbent U.S. Senator

Minor 
 Michael Karlton Brown (I)
 Skip Galan (I)
 Milton Gordon (I)
 Randall Todd Hayes (L)
 Tommy LaFargue (I)
 Bob Lang (I)
 William McShan (Reform)
 Sam Houston Melton Jr. (I)
 Mike Spears (I)
 Ernest Wooton (I)

Campaign 
Melançon heavily criticized Vitter for prostitution sex scandal. Vitter released television advertising criticizing Melançon for his support for Obama's stimulus package and his support for amnesty for illegal immigrants.

Debates 
Melançon claimed "In August, Melançon challenged Vitter to a series of five live, televised town hall-style debates across the state. In his 2004 campaign for Senate, Vitter committed to five live, televised debates.  Since Melançon issued the challenge, Vitter and Melançon have been invited to a total of seven live, televised debates. Vitter only accepted invitations to debates hosted by WWL-TV and WDSU-TV, both in New Orleans."

 September 7: Sponsored by the Alliance for Good Government at Loyola University.
 October 27: Sponsored by League of Women Voters-New Orleans, National Council of Jewish Women-New Orleans Junior League-New Orleans, and the American Association of University Women-Louisiana. Televised on WDSU-TV in  New Orleans.
 October 28: CBS News sponsored the debate. It was televised on WWL-TV and C-SPAN in New Orleans

Predictions

Polling

Fundraising

Results

References

External links 
 Louisiana Secretary of State - Elections
 U.S. Congress candidates for Louisiana at Project Vote Smart
 Louisiana U.S. Senate 2010 from OurCampaigns.com
 Campaign contributions from Open Secrets
 2010 Louisiana Senate General Election: All Head-to-Head Matchups graph of multiple polls from Pollster.com
 Election 2010: Louisiana Senate from Rasmussen Reports
 2010 Louisiana Senate Race from Real Clear Politics
 2010 Louisiana Senate Race from CQ Politics
 Race profile from The New York Times

Louisiana
2010
2010 Louisiana elections